The assembleia de freguesia (parish assembly) is the legislature of a freguesia (civil parish), the local administrative unit LAU 2 of Portugal. The laws regulating the assembleias de freguesia are the Lei n.o 169/99, de 18 de Setembro and the Lei n.o 5-A/2002 de 11 de Janeiro. The number of members of each assembly is dependent on the number of registered voters in each freguesia ranging from 7 if there are 1,000 or less registered voters to 19 if there are over 20,000 and an increase of one member per 10,000 registered voters after 30,000.

It is a level lower than the Assembleia Municipal.
The executive equivalent of the Assembleia de freguesia is the Junta de freguesia.

See also
 Junta de freguesia
 Assembleia Municipal
 Câmara municipal

References

Local government in Portugal